Roman numerals are a numeral system that originated in ancient Rome and remained the usual way of writing numbers throughout Europe well into the Late Middle Ages. Numbers are written with combinations of letters from the Latin alphabet, each letter with a fixed integer value. Modern style uses only these seven:

The use of Roman numerals continued long after the decline of the Roman Empire. From the 14th century on, Roman numerals began to be replaced by Arabic numerals; however, this process was gradual, and the use of Roman numerals persists in some applications to this day.

One place they are often seen is on clock faces. For instance, on the clock of Big Ben (designed in 1852), the hours from 1 to 12 are written as:

The notations  and  can be read as "one less than five" (4) and "one less than ten" (9), although there is a tradition favouring representation of "4" as "" on Roman numeral clocks.

Other common uses include year numbers on monuments and buildings and copyright dates on the title screens of movies and television programs. , signifying "a thousand, and a hundred less than another thousand", means 1900, so 1912 is written . For the years of this century,  indicates 2000.

Description 
Roman numerals use different symbols for each power of ten and no zero symbol, in contrast with the place value notation of Arabic numerals (in which place-keeping zeros enable the same digit to represent different powers of ten).

This allows some flexibility in notation, and there has never been an official or universally accepted standard for Roman numerals. Usage varied greatly in ancient Rome and became thoroughly chaotic in medieval times. Even the post-renaissance restoration of a largely "classical" notation has failed to produce total consistency: variant forms are even defended by some modern writers as offering improved "flexibility". On the other hand, especially where a Roman numeral is considered a legally binding expression of a number, as in U.S. Copyright law (where an "incorrect" or ambiguous numeral may invalidate a copyright claim, or affect the termination date of the copyright period) it is desirable to strictly follow the usual style described below.

Standard form
The following table displays how Roman numerals are usually written:

Subtractive notation is also used for 40, 90, 400 and 900. These are the only subtractive forms in standard use.

A number containing two or more decimal digits is built by appending the Roman numeral equivalent for each, from highest to lowest, as in the following examples:

 &numsp;&numsp;39 =  +  = .
 &numsp;246 =  +  +  = .
 &numsp;789 =  +  +  = .
2,421 =  +  +  +  = .

Any missing place (represented by a zero in the place-value equivalent) is omitted, as in Latin (and English) speech:

 &numsp;160 =  +  = 
 &numsp;207 =  +  = 
1,009 =  +  = 
1,066 =  +  +  = 

The largest number that can be represented in this manner is 3,999, but this is sufficient for the values for which Roman numerals are commonly used today, such as year numbers:
 1776 =  +  +  +  =  (the date written on the book held by the Statue of Liberty).
 1918 =  +  +  +  =  (the first year of the Spanish flu pandemic)
 1944 =  +  +  +  =  (erroneous copyright notice of the 1954 movie The Last Time I Saw Paris)
  =  (this year)

Prior to the introduction of Arabic numerals in the West, ancient and medieval users of Roman numerals used various means to write larger numbers; see large numbers below.

Other forms
Forms exist that vary in one way or another from the general standard represented above.

Other additive forms

The additive forms for 9, 90, and 900 (and ) have also been used, although less often.

The two conventions could be mixed in the same document or inscription, even in the same numeral.

Modern clock faces that use Roman numerals still very often use  for four o'clock but  for nine o'clock, a practice that goes back to very early clocks such as the Wells Cathedral clock of the late 14th century. However, this is far from universal: for example, the clock on the Palace of Westminster tower (commonly known as Big Ben) uses a subtractive  for 4 o'clock.

He did not say whose theory it was.

Several monumental inscriptions created in the early 20th century use variant forms for "1900" (usually written ).

Other subtractive forms
There is a common belief that any smaller digit placed to the left of a larger digit is subtracted from the total, and that by clever choices a long Roman numeral can be "compressed". There is no indication this is anything other than an invention by the programmer, and the universal-subtraction belief may be a result of modern users trying to rationalize the syntax of Roman numerals.

There are multiple examples of  being used for 8. The notation appears prominently on the cenotaph of their senior centurion Marcus Caelius ( – 9 AD). The latter can be seen on the sole extant pre-Julian calendar, the Fasti Antiates Maiores.

Rare variants
While irregular subtractive and additive notation has been used at least occasionally throughout history, some Roman numerals have been observed in documents and inscriptions that do not fit either system. Some of these variants do not seem to have been used outside specific contexts, and may have been regarded as errors even by contemporaries.

  was how people associated with the XXII Roman Legion used to write their number. The practice may have been due to a common way to say "twenty-second" in Latin, namely duo et vice(n)sima (literally "two and twentieth") rather than the "regular" vice(n)sima secunda (twenty second).

In some French texts from the 15th century and later, one finds constructions like  for 99, reflecting the French reading of that number as quatre-vingt-dix-neuf (four-score and nineteen). Similarly, in some English documents one finds, for example, 77 written as "" (which could be read "three-score and seventeen").
 A medieval accounting text from 1301 renders numbers like 13,573 as "", that is, "13×1000 + 5×100 + 3×20 + 13".

Non-numeric combinations
As Roman numerals are composed of ordinary alphabetic characters, there may sometimes be confusion with other uses of the same letters. For example, "XXX" and "XL" have other connotations in addition to their values as Roman numerals, while "IXL" more often than not is a gramogram of "I excel", and is in any case not an unambiguous Roman numeral.

Zero 
As a non-positional numeral system, Roman numerals have no "place-keeping" zeros. Furthermore, the system as used by the Romans lacked a numeral for the number zero itself (that is, what remains after 1 is subtracted from 1). The word  (the Latin word meaning "none") was used to represent 0, although the earliest attested instances are medieval. For instance Dionysius Exiguus used  alongside Roman numerals in a manuscript from 525 AD.

Fractions 

The arrangement of the dots was variable and not necessarily linear. Five dots arranged like (⁙) (as on the face of a die) are known as a quincunx, from the name of the Roman fraction/coin.

Other Roman fractional notations included the following:

Large numbers 

During the centuries that Roman numerals remained the standard way of writing numbers throughout Europe, there were various extensions to the system designed to indicate larger numbers, none of which were ever standardised.

Apostrophus 

This is a system of encasing numbers to denote thousands (imagine the s and s as parentheses), which has its origins in Etruscan numeral usage.

Similarly, each additional  to the right of  raises the value by a factor of ten:  represents 5,000 and  represents 50,000. Numerals larger than  do not occur.

 and  most likely preceded, and subsequently influenced, the adoption of "" and "" in Roman numerals.

Vinculum 
Another system was the vinculum, in which conventional Roman numerals were multiplied by 1,000 by adding a "bar" or "overline", thus:
  = 4,000
  = 25,000
It was a common alternative to the apostrophic ↀ during the Imperial era around the Roman world (M for '1000' was not in use until the Medieval period).
 It continued in use in the Middle Ages, though it became known more commonly as titulus, and it appears in modern editions of classical and medieval Latin texts.

A three-sided box (now sometimes printed as two vertical lines and a vinculum) was used to multiply by 100,000, thus:
  p. = 1,332,000 paces (1,332 Roman miles).

Vinculum notation is distinct from the custom of adding an overline to a numeral simply to indicate that it is a number, and both usages can be seen on Roman inscriptions of the same period and general location, such as on the Antonine Wall.

Origin 
The system is closely associated with the ancient city-state of Rome and the Empire that it created. However, due to the scarcity of surviving examples, the origins of the system are obscure and there are several competing theories, all largely conjectural.

Etruscan numerals

Rome was founded sometime between 850 and 750 BC. At the time, the region was inhabited by diverse populations of which the Etruscans were the most advanced. The ancient Romans themselves admitted that the basis of much of their civilization was Etruscan. Rome itself was located next to the southern edge of the Etruscan domain, which covered a large part of north-central Italy.

As in the basic Roman system, the Etruscans wrote the symbols that added to the desired number, from higher to lower value. Thus, the number 87, for example, would be written 50 + 10 + 10 + 10 + 5 + 1 + 1 = 𐌣𐌢𐌢𐌢𐌡𐌠𐌠 (this would appear as 𐌠𐌠𐌡𐌢𐌢𐌢𐌣 since Etruscan was written from right to left.)

The Etruscans used the subtractive notation, too, but not like the Romans. They wrote 17, 18, and 19 as 𐌠𐌠𐌠𐌢𐌢, 𐌠𐌠𐌢𐌢, and 𐌠𐌢𐌢, mirroring the way they spoke those numbers ("three from twenty", etc.); and similarly for 27, 28, 29, 37, 38, etc. However, they did not write 𐌠𐌡 for 4 (nor 𐌢𐌣 for 40), and wrote 𐌡𐌠𐌠, 𐌡𐌠𐌠𐌠 and 𐌡𐌠𐌠𐌠𐌠 for 7, 8, and 9, respectively.

Early Roman numerals 

It might have helped that C was the initial letter of CENTUM, Latin for "hundred".

The notation for 1000 was a circled or boxed : Ⓧ, and by Augustinian times was partially identified with the Greek letter  phi. The latter symbol further evolved into , then , and eventually changed to  under the influence of the Latin word mille "thousand".

Classical Roman numerals 
The most obvious anomaly (a common one that persisted for centuries) is the inconsistent use of subtractive notation - while  is used for 40,  is avoided in favour of : in fact, gate 44 is labelled .

Use in the Middle Ages and Renaissance 

Since the Middle Ages, a "" has sometimes been substituted for the final "" of a "lower-case" Roman numeral, such as "" for 3 or "" for 7. This "" can be considered a swash variant of "". Into the early 20th century, the use of a final "" was still sometimes used in medical prescriptions to prevent tampering with or misinterpretation of a number after it was written.

Numerals in documents and inscriptions from the Middle Ages sometimes include additional symbols, which today are called "medieval Roman numerals". Some simply substitute another letter for the standard one (such as "" for "", or "" for ""), while others serve as abbreviations for compound numerals ("" for "", or "" for ""). Although they are still listed today in some dictionaries, they are long out of use.

Chronograms, messages with dates encoded into them, were popular during the Renaissance era. By putting these letters together, the reader would obtain a number, usually indicating a particular year.

Modern use 
By the 11th century, Arabic numerals had been introduced into Europe from al-Andalus, by way of Arab traders and arithmetic treatises. Roman numerals, however, proved very persistent, remaining in common use in the West well into the 14th and 15th centuries, even in accounting and other business records (where the actual calculations would have been made using an abacus). Replacement by their more convenient "Arabic" equivalents was quite gradual, and Roman numerals are still used today in certain contexts. A few examples of their current use are:

 Names of monarchs and popes, e.g. Elizabeth II of the United Kingdom, Pope Benedict XVI. These are referred to as regnal numbers and are usually read as ordinals; e.g.  is pronounced "the second". This tradition began in Europe sporadically in the Middle Ages, gaining widespread use in England during the reign of Henry VIII. Previously, the monarch was not known by numeral but by an epithet such as Edward the Confessor. Some monarchs (e.g.
 Generational suffixes, particularly in the U.S., for people sharing the same name across generations, for example William Howard Taft IV. These are also usually read as ordinals.
 In the French Republican Calendar, initiated during the French Revolution, years were numbered by Roman numerals – from the year  (1792) when this calendar was introduced to the year  (1805) when it was abandoned.
 The year of production of films, television shows and other works of art within the work itself. Outside reference to the work will use regular Arabic numerals.

 Hour marks on timepieces. In this context, 4 is often written .
 The year of construction on building façades and cornerstones.
 Page numbering of prefaces and introductions of books, and sometimes of appendices and annexes, too.
 Book volume and chapter numbers, as well as the several acts within a play (e.g. Act , Scene 2).
 Sequels to some films, video games, and other works (as in Rocky II, Grand Theft Auto V).
 Outlines that use numbers to show hierarchical relationships.
 Occurrences of a recurring grand event, for instance:
 The Summer and Winter Olympic Games (e.g. the XXI Olympic Winter Games; the Games of the XXX Olympiad).
 The Super Bowl, the annual championship game of the National Football League (e.g. Super Bowl XLII; Super Bowl 50 was a one-time exception).
 WrestleMania, the annual professional wrestling event for the WWE (e.g. WrestleMania XXX). This usage has also been inconsistent.

Specific disciplines 
In astronautics, United States rocket model variants are sometimes designated by Roman numerals, e.g. Titan I, Titan II, Titan III, Saturn I, Saturn V.

In astronomy, the natural satellites or "moons" of the planets are designated by capital Roman numerals appended to the planet's name. For example, Titan's designation is Saturn .

In chemistry, Roman numerals are sometimes used to denote the groups of the periodic table, but this has officially been deprecated in favour of Arabic numerals. They are also used in the IUPAC nomenclature of inorganic chemistry, for the oxidation number of cations which can take on several different positive charges. They are also used for naming phases of polymorphic crystals, such as ice.

In education, school grades (in the sense of year-groups rather than test scores) are sometimes referred to by a Roman numeral; for example, "grade " is sometimes seen for "grade 9".

In entomology, the broods of the thirteen and seventeen year periodical cicadas are identified by Roman numerals.

In graphic design stylised Roman numerals may represent numeric values.

In law, Roman numerals are commonly used to help organize legal codes as part of an alphanumeric outline.

These quadrant names signify positive numbers on both axes, negative numbers on the X axis, negative numbers on both axes, and negative numbers on the Y axis, respectively. The use of Roman numerals to designate quadrants avoids confusion, since Arabic numerals are used for the actual data represented in the graph.

In military unit designation, Roman numerals are often used to distinguish between units at different levels. This reduces possible confusion, especially when viewing operational or strategic level maps. In particular, army corps are often numbered using Roman numerals (for example the American XVIII Airborne Corps or the WW2-era German III Panzerkorps) with Arabic numerals being used for divisions and armies.

In music, Roman numerals are used in several contexts:
 Movements are often numbered using Roman numerals.
 In Roman Numeral Analysis, harmonic function is identified using Roman Numerals.
 Individual strings of stringed instruments, such as the violin, are often denoted by Roman numerals, with higher numbers denoting lower strings.

In photography, Roman numerals (with zero) are used to denote varying levels of brightness when using the Zone System.

In seismology, Roman numerals are used to designate degrees of the Mercalli intensity scale of earthquakes.

In sport the team containing the "top" players and representing a nation or province, a club or a school at the highest level in (say) rugby union is often called the "1st ", while a lower-ranking cricket or American football team might be the "3rd ".

In tarot, Roman numerals (with zero) are used to denote the cards of the Major Arcana.

Modern use in European languages other than English 
Some uses that are rare or never seen in English speaking countries may be relatively common in parts of continental Europe and in other regions (e.g. Latin America) that use a European language other than English. For instance:

Capital or small capital Roman numerals are widely used in Romance languages to denote , e.g. the French  and the Spanish  mean "18th century". Slavic languages in and adjacent to Russia similarly favor Roman numerals. On the other hand, in Slavic languages in Central Europe, like most Germanic languages, one writes "18." (with a period) before the local word for "century".

Mixed Roman and Arabic numerals are sometimes used in numeric representations of dates (especially in formal letters and official documents, but also on tombstones). The  is written in Roman numerals, while the day is in Arabic numerals: "4..1789" and ".4.1789" both refer unambiguously to 4 June 1789.

The hours of operation signs are tables composed of two columns where the left column is the day of the week in Roman numerals and the right column is a range of hours of operation from starting time to closing time. In the example case (left), the business opens from 10 AM to 7 PM on weekdays, 10 AM to 5 PM on Saturdays and is closed on Sundays. Note that the listing uses 24-hour time.

Roman numerals may also be used for floor numbering. For instance, apartments in central Amsterdam are indicated as 138-, with both an Arabic numeral (number of the block or house) and a Roman numeral (floor number).

The sign  thus marks 17.9 km.

Certain romance-speaking countries use Roman numerals to designate assemblies of their national legislatures. For instance, the composition of the Italian Parliament from 2018 to 2022 (elected in the 2018 Italian general election) is called the XVIII Legislature of the Italian Republic (or more commonly the "XVIII Legislature").

A notable exception to the use of Roman numerals in Europe is in Greece, where Greek numerals (based on the Greek alphabet) are generally used in contexts where Roman numerals would be used elsewhere.

Unicode
The "Number Forms" block of the Unicode computer character set standard has a number of Roman numeral symbols in the range of code points from U+2160 to U+2188. This range includes both upper- and lowercase numerals, as well as pre-combined characters for numbers up to 12 (Ⅻ or ). One justification for the existence of pre-combined numbers is to facilitate the setting of multiple-letter numbers (such as VIII) on a single horizontal line in Asian vertical text. The Unicode standard, however, includes special Roman numeral code points for compatibility only, stating that "[f]or most purposes, it is preferable to compose the Roman numerals from sequences of the appropriate Latin letters".
The block also includes some apostrophus symbols for large numbers, an old variant of "L" (50) similar to the Etruscan character, the Claudian letter "reversed C", etc.

See also

References

Notes

Citations

Sources

Further reading 

 Aczel, Amir D. 2015. Finding Zero: A Mathematician's Odyssey to Uncover the Origins of Numbers. 1st edition. New York: Palgrave Macmillan.
 Goines, David Lance. A Constructed Roman Alphabet: A Geometric Analysis of the Greek and Roman Capitals and of the Arabic Numerals. Boston: D.R. Godine, 1982.
 Houston, Stephen D. 2012. The Shape of Script: How and Why Writing Systems Change. Santa Fe, NM: School for Advanced Research Press.
 Taisbak, Christian M. 1965. "Roman numerals and the abacus." Classica et medievalia 26: 147–60.

External links 

 

Numerals
Numeral systems
Roman mathematics
Latin script
Legacy of the Roman Empire